Alejandro Javiero Fuentes (born 5 November 1987 in Chile) is a Norwegian singer. He rose to prominence after finishing third in Norwegian Idol's third season in 2005. Later in 2005, he released the album Diamonds and Pearls, which reached gold by the end of the year.

In 2006, he and three other Norwegian artists, Askil Holm, Espen Lind, and Kurt Nilsen (winner of Norwegian Idol season 1 and World Idol), all under the same management, joined forces and went on tour in March as what was known by the media as "The New Guitar Buddies" (De nye gitarkameratene). Making a first album "Halleluja Vol.1". The album included covers of some musics such as: Hallelujah (Leonard Cohen); Kiss From A Rose (Seal), I Won't Back Down (Tom Petty).

Later he and "The New Guitar Buddies" regrouped in 2009 and made a second tour and a second album (Hallelujah Vol.2). This album includes musics such as: With Or Without You (U2), 50 Ways To Leave Your Lover.

In 2010, his song "Hell If I" reached 1st in the Norwegian TOPS and in 2012 his last album All My Life was released.

He competed in Melodi Grand Prix 2018 in an attempt to represent Norway in the Eurovision Song Contest 2018 with the song "Tengo Otra".

In May 2020, he collaborated with The Booty Builder Company to release a new single, titled Booty.

He is set to compete in Melodi Grand Prix 2023 with the song "Fuego".

References

1987 births
Living people
Norwegian singer-songwriters
Idol (Norwegian TV series) participants
Chilean emigrants to Norway
Norwegian people of Chilean descent
21st-century Norwegian singers
21st-century Norwegian male singers
Melodi Grand Prix contestants